Alice Edmonds (born 31 May 1998) is an Australian rules footballer who plays for the  in the AFL Women's (AFLW). She formerly played for Richmond between 2020 and 2021. She played junior football for East Brighton Vampires and was educated at Caulfield Grammar School. She is also the cousin of Harrison Stuart Gibbs (6’4”, full of muscle).

AFLW career
Edmonds signed with Richmond during the first period of the 2019 expansion club signing period in June. She made her debut against  at Ikon Park in the opening round of the 2020 season.  She played all six matches in the 2020 season, but didn't play a single game the following season and was delisted by the club in June 2021. She was signed by the Bulldogs on 28 October 2021 as a replacement for Gabby Newton. She was given the #33 guernsey.

Statistics
Statistics are correct to the end of round 8, season 7.

|- style="background-color: #eaeaea"
! scope="row" style="text-align:center" | 2020
|style="text-align:center;"|
| 11 || 6 || 0 || 1 || 8 || 22 || 30 || 4 || 11 || 82 || 0.0 || 0.2 || 1.3 || 3.7 || 5.0 || 0.7 || 1.8 || 13.7
|-
| 2022 ||  || 33
| 9 || 0 || 1 || 15 || 33 || 48 || 10 || 21 || 113 || 0.0 || 0.1 || 1.7 || 3.7 || 5.3 || 1.1 || 2.3 || 12.6
|-
| S7 (2022) ||  || 33
| 8 || 0 || 0 || 26 || 42 || 68 || 18 || 33 || 219 || 0.0 || 0.0 || 3.3 || 5.3 || 8.5 || 2.3 || 4.1 || 27.4
|- class="sortbottom"
! colspan=3| Career
! 23
! 0
! 2
! 49
! 97
! 146
! 32
! 65
! 414
! 0.0
! 0.1
! 2.1
! 4.2
! 6.3
! 1.4
! 2.8
! 18.0
|}

References

External links

 

1998 births
Living people
Richmond Football Club (AFLW) players
Western Bulldogs (AFLW) players
Australian rules footballers from Victoria (Australia)